3D Control Systems is an American software company based in San Francisco, California. It is best known for distributing the software platform 3DPrinterOS, which provides software packages for 3D printers, along with the manufacturing platform ZAP.

History 
The company was founded by John Dogru and Anton Vedeshin in 2014.  Dogru and Vedeshin first released 3DPrinterOS for MacOS, Windows, Linux, and Raspberry Pi.

3D Control Systems partnered with the online education company MyStemKits to provide 3D printing education for K-12 schools in 2015. 3D Control Systems also released 3DPrinterOS under an educational license in the same year.
3D printer manufacturer Dremel began using 3DPrinterOS as its products’ built-in interface in 2017.

3D Control Systems formed a manufacturing partnership with MilleBot in 2020, partnering to create factory machines and manufacturing crates with 5G capabilities and manufacturing software.

In 2021, 3D Control Systems released the automated software platform ZAP. 3D Control Systems also collaborated with Microsoft to bring a 3DPrinterOS software bundle to the Microsoft Azure cloud platform in 2021.

BeAM, the University of North Carolina’s makerspace network, began using 3DPrinterOS for its makerspaces in 2022. Duke University’s Innovation Lab uses the 3DPrinterOS to create medical models for medical training.[23] 3D Control Systems also released a cloud-based version of 3DPrinterOS that was compatible with Formlabs products in 2022.

Product details 
3DPrinterOS allows users to manage multiple 3D printers and their users and monitor details such as prints and inventory levels. Its software installs directly onto most 3D printers. The 3DPrinterOS software packages also gives users access to analytic data. Their interface is mostly part of their website, including slicing and analytics, which provides the flexibility to control and monitor from any device.

The 3DPrinterOS platform can control multiple 3D printers remotely. 3DPrinterOS can be run both through local servers and cloud computing. When used through the cloud, 3DPrinterOS uses a secure cloud interface.

References 

3D printer companies
2014 establishments in California
Manufacturing companies established in 2014